The Honda CTX1300 is a cruiser motorcycle with shaft drive and  a longitudinally mounted V4 engine.

Development
The CTX1300 succeeded the ST1300, (also called the "Pan-European" in Europe), which was discontinued after the 2012 model year. In November 2013, following deletion of the ST1300 model, Honda announced the CTX1300, which was powered by a version of the ST1300's engine modified for better fuel economy and increased torque at low RPM. Max torque was 78.19 ft/lbs (106.0 Nm) @ 4500 RPM. Claimed horsepower was 81.4 HP (60.7 KW) @ 6000 RPM.

Abandoning the Pan-European bias of the ST1300, the CTX1300 reverted to a North American theme, with its half-fairing, raked-back handlebar  and bagger styling.

The CTX1300 was available in standard and "Deluxe" specification, the latter having traction control, ABS and Bluetooth.

Reception
Well-received in Australia and the US, European reviews of the CTX were mixed but positive overall.

References

CTX1300
Shaft drive motorcycles